This is a list of all the United States Supreme Court cases from volume 404 of the United States Reports:

External links

1971 in United States case law
1972 in United States case law